Non si ruba a casa dei ladri is a 2016 Italian comedy film directed by Carlo Vanzina.

Cast
Vincenzo Salemme as Antonio Russo
Massimo Ghini as Simone Santoro
Stefania Rocca as Daniela Russo
Manuela Arcuri as Lori Carlucci
Maurizio Mattioli as Giorgio Bonetti
Teco Celio as Herr Muller
Lorenzo Balducci as Michele
Liliana Vitale as aunt Titina
Barbara Ramella as Francesca
Ria Antōniou as Demetra
Ralph Palka as the banker
Fabrizio Buompastore as Maronaro

References

External links

2016 films
Films directed by Carlo Vanzina
2010s Italian-language films
2016 comedy films
Italian comedy films
2010s Italian films